A list of films produced by the Bollywood film industry based in Mumbai in 1924:

1924 in Indian cinema
Master Vithal made his debut as a dancing girl in Kalyan Khajina also called The Treasures of Khajina, directed by Baburao Painter.
Khalil, termed as the "First Star" made his debut as a hero in Gul-E-Bakavali. He played a supporting role in the film Kala Naag.

Films
Bismi Sadi also called 20th Century is cited as the start of melodrama films. It was directed by Homi Master and was the story of a hawker turned into a ruthless mill-owner.
Gul-E-Bakavali was directed by Kanjibhai Rathod for Dwarkadas Sampat's Kohinoor Film Company banner. Made as a fantasy, the film was a big success breaking records and running in theatres for fourteen weeks.
Kala Naag is a 1924 silent action thriller film directed by Kanjibhai Rathod and assisted by Homi Master. Produced under the Kohinoor Co, Bombay, it was the  first "recorded example" with real-life characters based on the Champsi-Haridas Murder case in Bombay. The film aimed at a "pan-Indian" audience was a commercial success. Homi Master played the lead role. 
Poona Raided was directed by B. V. Warerkar. The film is acclaimed as one of Mama Warerkar's finest directorial ventures. The historical was based on the  17th century Maratha Emperor Shivaji's resistance and counter-attack following the raid on Poona by Aurangzeb. The film was also the debut of Sundarrao Nadkarni, in a small role. 
Prithvi Vallabh directed by Homi Master was based on K. M. Munshi's Gujarati novel Prithivivallabh. The film was a success at the box-office and was "widely acclaimed".
Kalyan Khajina directed by Baburao Painter was a historical adventure movie based on the heroic actions of the 17th Century Maratha emperor Shivaji. 
Sati Padmini directed by Baburao Painter was about the Rajput queen Padmini of Chittor. The film received favourable reviews in the British Press when it was released at the British Empire exhibition at Wembley.
Sati Sardarba was directed by Nanubhai Desai for his newly launched Saraswati Film Company banner. It starred Fatma Begum with Sultana and Zubeida and is stated to have become a big success commercially.

A-J

K-R

S-Z

References

External links
 Bollywood films of 1924 at IMDb

1924
Bollywood
Films, Bollywood